Chazen is a surname. Notable people with the surname include: 

Adam Chazen (born 1986), American special effects producer
Bernie Chazen (1942–2009), American bridge playe
Debbie Chazen (born 1971), English actress
Jerome Chazen (1927–2022), American businessman 
Stephen Chazen (1946–2022), American businessman